Tanya Anisimova (born February 15, 1966) is an American cellist and composer of Russian descent.

Tanya Anisimova was born in the Chechen city of Grozny into a family of scientists: her father Dr. Mikhail Anisimov is a well-known physicist. Her mother was a chemist and an accomplished piano player and singer who died in 1981. Tanya Anisimova became a naturalised American citizen in 1994.

Tanya began to study cello at 7 with Zoia Kamisheva and gave her first public performance the same year. After graduating with honors from the Moscow Conservatory (1989), where she studied with Igor Gavrysh, Anisimova continued her cello studies with George Neikrug at Boston University (Artist Diploma, 1992). While in Boston, she appeared regularly on WGBH Public Radio. In 1992, Anisimova was invited by Aldo Parisot to work on her Doctor of Musical Arts Degree at Yale. She graduated from Yale School of Music in 1995. In her doctoral thesis she focused on J.S. Bach's works for solo violin and solo cello and their interconnectedness.

Also in 1995, Anisimova and her husband artist Alexander Anufriev spent four months at the Virginia Center for the Creative Arts by an invitation of the VCCA's director William  Smart. In the fall of 1995, Anisimova and Anufriev successfully presented their multimedia project titled Angels on Mt. San Angelo, The visual part included six canvases, 15 by 10 feet each, with angels representing six colors of a spectrum, all painted by Anufriev. The audio part consisted of Anisimova's Song on Mt. San Angelo, which was performed live during the presentation of the project. One year later, the project was repeated with success at the St. Mark's Church on Capitol Hill, Washington, D.C.

In 1999, Anisimova initiated the revival and consequently became the Artistic Director of the Mousetrap Concert Series in the historic town of Washington Grove, Maryland. Guest artists of the series have included Claude Frank, Natalia Gutman, Elisso Virsaladze, Paul Katz, The St. Petersburg Quartet, The Calder Quartet, The Thibaud Trio, The Scholars of London, Paul Galbraith, Tigran Alikhanov, Igor Gavrysh, among others. Since 2001, Tanya Anisimova and her husband reside in the Blue Ridge Mountains region of Central Virginia. Anisimova divides her time between touring, composing and recording.

Playing style
The press has described cellist and composer Tanya Anisimova as the artist with "spiritual authority" and "a refined musical intelligence"; her performances -  as "thoughtful and powerful, alluring and energizing"; her interpretations - as "invariably full of personality and character."  Anisimova's original music has been quoted as "deeply emotional," "mystical," and "marrying a sense of wild fancy and studied control." Of the performer's live improvisations with her own vocalizing it has been said that they have "subtle harmonies" and "a very refined melody, clearly in Slavic style."  Joseph McLellan of the  called Anisimova's improvisations "powerfully evocative vocalises, which she sang with a pure, precisely controlled voice."

The Washington Post. Articles: "Thoughtful and Powerful Cello Recital at Strathmore," October, 2007;
"Tanya Anisimova's Singing Endorsement of the Cello," April, 2003; "Beguiling Music at Hand," March, 1999
 
"Mi Morelia", Michoacan, Mexico.
Article "Banqueto de Violonchelo y de Beethoven", February, 2005

Discography

1. "Music from Mt. San Angelo," 1995
The Virginia Center for the Creative Arts

2. J.S. Bach, "Six Sonatas and Partitas for Solo Violin," 2001
Celle-stial Records Company
This is the first complete cycle recorded on modern cello. Original keys were used except for partitas 1 & 3.

3. J.S. Bach, Six Suites for Solo Cello, 2002 
Volume 1, Suites No. 1, 3 & 5

4. J.S. Bach, Six Suites for Solo Cello, 2004
Volume 2, Suites No. 2, 4 & 6 
Celle-stial Records Company

5. "Concert in Moscow," 2003
Celle-stial Records Company

6. "Sufi Soul," 2006  
Celle-stial Records Company

7. "Mystical Strings-Enchanted Cello," 2007
The Synchronicity Foundation

Original works

Cello transcriptions and arrangements
1995-2001, J.S. Bach, Complete Sonatas and Partitas for Violin Solo

2002, Francouer-Anisimova, Sonata for Two Cellos in D
(inspired by the Cello Sonata E Major)

2008, Locatelli-Anisimova, Sonata for Cello and Piano 
(based on the original version for violin and continuo)

2003-2005, Ludwig van Beethoven, Complete Sonatas for Violin and Piano

2006-2008, Johannes Brahms, Complete Sonatas for Violin and Piano

2004, Pablo de Sarasate, Playera, Gypsy Aires

2004, Marin Marais, La Folia

2003, Diniku, Hora-Staccatto

References

Russian emigrants to the United States
Russian classical cellists
People from Grozny
American classical cellists
1966 births
Living people
Contemporary classical music performers
Boston University College of Fine Arts alumni
Yale School of Music alumni
American women composers
21st-century American composers
Moscow Conservatory alumni
Russian women classical cellists
21st-century American women musicians
21st-century women composers
21st-century cellists